Hamza Bey Mosque is a 15th-century Ottoman Mosque in Thessaloniki, Greece.
 Modern Thessalonians commonly known it as Alkazar, after a cinema that operated in the premises for decades.

History
It was built by order of Hafsa Hatun, the daughter of Isa Bey Evrenosoğlu, but named after Hamza Bey, the Beylerbey of Rumeli. It was damaged in later earthquakes and fires and was rebuilt in 1620, and a medrassa was added.
Following the population exchange between Greece and Turkey, the mosque no longer functioned as a religious building and became the property of the National Bank of Greece. It initially housed various military services, and although it was declared a protected monument in 1926, it was sold in 1928 to private owners. 
The building was subsequently used for several decades as a porn-cinema, and suffered extensive modifications. The mosque was handed over to the Greek Ministry of Culture in 2006, and restoration work has been under way since.

Architecture
The mosque is covered by one dome, it had one minaret which was removed after 1923.

See also 
 List of former mosques in Greece
 List of mosques in Greece

References

External links

Information in Turkish 

Ottoman architecture in Thessaloniki
Ottoman mosques in Greece
Religious buildings and structures completed in 1460
15th-century mosques
Religion in Thessaloniki
15th-century architecture in Greece
Former mosques in Greece
Mosque buildings with domes
Macedonia under the Ottoman Empire